This is a list of the longest running U.S. primetime television series, ordered by the number of broadcast seasons offered by a U.S. broadcast network or cable network in prime time on the show's original run. Broadcast syndication that could have been scheduled by local stations in prime time have been omitted.

Longest telecasted series

50 seasons or more

30–49 seasons

20–29 seasons

15–19 seasons

12–14 seasons

10–11 seasons

See also
Lists of longest running U.S. shows by broadcast type:
 List of longest-running United States television series
 List of longest-running U.S. broadcast network television series
 List of longest-running U.S. cable television series
 List of longest-running U.S. first-run syndicated television series
 List of longest-running scripted U.S. primetime television series
Lists of longest running shows internationally:
 List of longest-running television shows by category- international list
 List of longest-running Australian television series
 List of longest-running British television series
 List of longest-running Philippine television series
List of shortest running shows:
 List of television series canceled after one episode
 List of television series canceled before airing an episode

Notes

Longest running prime time
Primetime
US primetime